Catia La Mar is a city and port in the municipality of Vargas, in the State of Vargas, Venezuela.  It is Maiquetia's neighbor to the west.

Catia la Mar is about 10 minutes from Simón Bolívar International Airport (Venezuela's main airport).

Named after the 16th-century cacique Catia, contemporary of Guaicaipuro, founded in 1558 by Francisco Fajardo with the name of "La Villa de Catia", currently called Catia la Mar. The city hosts a naval academy and university, a fishing port called La Zorra, and several beaches (Costa Dorada, Playa La Zorra, Playa Candilejas, Puerto Viejo). Its main neighborhoods are Atlantida, Playa Grande, Páez, Ezequiel Zamora, La Lucha, and La Soublette.

According to the 2011 population census, the city had 85,366 inhabitants, making it the most populous of the 11 parishes in Vargas State.

The city was affected by the 1999 Vargas tragedy.

See also 

Venezuela
Vargas state

References 

Cities in Vargas (state)
Port cities in Venezuela
Port cities in the Caribbean